Joseph Abibos is the name of a saint who founded a monastery in Alaverdi and served as abbot. A native of Syria, he was a disciple of John of Zedazeni and one of the Thirteen Assyrian Fathers. He is mentioned in Bessarion's The Saints of Georgia. His feast day is celebrated on September 15.

References

Further reading
Holweck, F. G. A Biographical Dictionary of the Saints. St. Louis, MO: B. Herder Book Co. 1924.

Christian saints in unknown century
Year of birth missing
Year of death missing
Saints of Georgia (country)